Drew Gress (born November 20, 1959) is an American jazz double-bassist and composer born in Trenton, New Jersey and raised in the Philadelphia area.

Biography

Gress studied at Towson State University and Manhattan School of Music. In the late 1980s he worked with Phil Haynes, recording several  albums with the group Joint Venture.

In 1998, he released his first album as leader, Heyday, with his band Jagged Sky (featuring David Binney, Ben Monder, and Kenny Wollesen). Gress wrote all except two of the compositions. Two years later, he recorded Spin & Drift, on which he also played steel guitar. He recorded material for two further albums – 7 Black Butterflies and The Irrational Numbers – in 2004.

Gress has taught at Peabody Conservatory and Western Connecticut State University. He has also served tenures as artist in residence at University of Colorado-Boulder and at Russia's St. Petersburg Conservatory.

Gress has toured Europe, Asia, and South America. Those with whom he has and continues to work include Tim Berne, Uri Caine, Fred Hersch, Don Byron, Dave Douglas, and Erik Friedlander.

Critic John Fordham described a performance by Gress's group as "one of the great jazz performances in Britain in 2002". In 2004, the UK's BBC Radio and London's Guardian selected his quartet's live radio broadcast as Jazz Concert of the Year.

Composition awards include an NEA grant (1990), funding from Meet the Composer (2003).

Playing and composing style
The DownBeat reviewer of Vesper, a collaboration between Gress and the trio expEAR, wrote that the bassist "has exquisite time and a composer's sense of line, a combination that allows him an insightful level of counterpoint in his playing". The DownBeat reviewer of Gress's The Sky inside wrote that he "favors a focused restraint, a sort of concentrated tension that wrings the maximum inspiration from minimal elements, and which maintains a taut severity even when spare free passages burst into angular swing".

Discography

As leader
 Heyday (as Drew Gress's Jagged Sky) (Soul Note, 1998)
 Spin & Drift (Premonition, 2001)
 7 Black Butterflies (Premonition, 2005)
 The Irrational Numbers (Premonition, 2008)
 And Again with Shims Trio (Deepdig, 2012)
 The Sky Inside (Pirouet, 2013)

As sideman
With John Abercrombie
 Within a Song (ECM, 2012)
 39 Steps (ECM, 2013)
 Up and Coming (ECM, 2017)

With Tim Berne
 Visitation Rites (Screwgun, 1997)
 Please Advise (Screwgun, 1999)
 Pre-Emptive Denial (Screwgun, 2005)

With Uri Caine
 Wagner e Venezia (Winter & Winter, 1997)
 The Goldberg Variations (Winter & Winter, 2000)
 Uri Caine Ensemble Plays Mozart (Winter & Winter, 2006)

With Joint Venture
 Joint Venture (Enja, 1987)
 Ways (Enja, 1989)
 Mirrors (Enja, 1994)

With Yelena Eckemoff
 In the Shadow of a Cloud (L&H, 2017)
 Better Than Gold and Silver (L&H, 2018)
 I Am a Stranger in This World (L&H, 2022)

With others
 Ralph Alessi, Baida (ECM, 2013)
 Ray Anderson, Big Band Record (Gramavision, 1994)
 Lynne Arriale, With Words Unspoken (DMP, 1996)
 Jon Ballantyne, The Loose (Justin Time, 1994)
 Don Byron, Romance with the Unseen (Blue Note, 1999)
 Marc Copland, Night Whispers (Pirouet, 2009)
 Marc Copland, Better by Far (InnerVoice, 2017)
 Dave Douglas, Five (Soul Note, 1996)
 Dave Douglas, Convergence (Soul Note, 1999)
 Ellery Eskelin, Setting the Standard (Cadence, 1989)
 Erik Friedlander, Chimera (Avant, 1995
 Erik Friedlander, The Watchman (Tzadik, 1996)
 David Kane, Machinery of the Night (Magellan, 2006)
 Tony Malaby, Apparations (Songlines, 2003)
 Liam Noble, Romance Among the Fishes (Basho, 2005)
 Jason Robinson, Tiresian Symmetry (Cuneiform, 2012)
 Samo Salamon, Almost Almond (Sanje, 2011)
 John Surman, Brewster's Rooster (ECM, 2007)
 Tom Varner, Martian Heartache (Soul Note, 1996)

References

External links
[ Drew Gress] at Allmusic
[ Joint Venture Discography] at Allmusic

1959 births
Living people
Musicians from Trenton, New Jersey
Towson University alumni
21st-century double-bassists
21st-century American male musicians
American jazz double-bassists
Classical Jazz Quartet members
Male double-bassists
American male jazz musicians
Pennsbury High School alumni
Pirouet Records artists
Enja Records artists
Basho Records artists